Aaron E. Miller, M.D. is an American neurologist, the first Chairman of the Multiple Sclerosis section of the American Academy of Neurology (AAN) and recognized as a multiple sclerosis clinician.

Miller is both a professor of neurology at the Icahn School of Medicine at Mount Sinai and medical director of the Corinne Goldsmith Dickinson Center for Multiple Sclerosis, both part of the Mount Sinai Medical Center. Additionally, he continues to serve as co-director of the Multiple Sclerosis Care Center at Maimonides Medical Center in Brooklyn.

Biography
Miller graduated from Brandeis University with honors in 1964 and received his medical degree from New York University School of Medicine in 1968. He completed his residency at the Albert Einstein College of Medicine, later acquiring additional postdoctoral training in neurovirology and immunology at the Johns Hopkins School of Hygiene and Public Health.

He was a Lieutenant Commander in the United States Navy from 1971 to 1973.

From 1981 until 2004, Miller headed the Division of Neurology at Brooklyn's Maimonides Medical Center; he continues to serve as co-director of its Multiple Sclerosis Care Center.

In 2004, he assumed his current title of medical director of the CGD Center for MS at Mount Sinai Hospital, of which Fred D. Lublin, MD is Director. 
Miller currently serves as Editor of Continuum, AAN's bimonthly continuing education publication, and he is a reviewer for many prominent journals including the New England Journal of Medicine, Neurology and the Archives of Neurology as well as co-author of one of the most-frequently cited articles in Brain: A Journal of Neurology.

In 2001, Miller became the Chief Medical Officer and Chairman of the Clinical Advisory Board of the National Multiple Sclerosis Society (NMSS); he served as chairman of the Clinical Advisory Committee of the New York chapter of the NMSS from 1991 to 2004 and has received grant/research support from Acorda Therapeutics, Biogen Idec, Genzyme, Novartis, and Teva Neuroscience.

He is listed in New York magazine's "Best Doctors" issue of 2008.

Awards
 1998 – Elected Member, American Neurological Association
 1985 – current,  Fellow, American Academy of Neurology
 1979 – 1981, Teacher-Investigator Award, NINCDS
 1968 – Alpha Omega Alpha, New York University School of Medicine
 1964 – Phi Beta Kappa, Mu chapter of Massachusetts, Brandeis University
 Fellow, New York Academy of Medicine

Memberships and affiliations
Chairman, Clinical Advisory Committee, National Multiple Sclerosis Society
Former co-chairman, American Academy of Neurology Education Committee
Scientific Advisory Committee member, National Multiple Sclerosis Society
International Advisory Committee on Clinical Trials in Multiple Sclerosis

Publications
Partial list:

Miller A, Bourdette D, Cohen JA, Coyle PK, Lublin F, Paty DW, Rice GP, Weinstock-Guttman B, editors. Multiple Sclerosis. New York, Continuum; 1999. pp1–196.
Cutter GR, Baier ML, Rudick RA, Cookfair DL, Fischer JS, Petkau J, Syndulko K, Weinshenker BG, Antel JP, Confavreux C, Ellison GW, Lublin F, Miller A, Rao SM, Reingold S, Thompson A, Willoughby E. Development of a multiple sclerosis functional composite as a clinical trial outcome measure. Brain 1999; 122: 871–882.
Schwid S, Goodman A, Apatoff B, Coyle P, Jacobs L, Krupp L, Miller A, Wende K, Brownscheidle, New York State Multiple Sclerosis Consortium. Are quantitative functional measures more sensitive to worsening MS than traditional measures? Neurology 2000; 55: 1901–1903. 
Miller A. Paroxysmal Disorders. In: Burks JS, Johnson KP, editors. Multiple Sclerosis. Diagnosis, Medical Management and Rehabilitation. New York, Demos Medical Publishing, Inc.; 2000.
Miller A, Herndon RM. Treatment Issues. In: Kalb RC, editor. Multiple Sclerosis. The questions you have – the answers you need. Second New York, Demos Medical Publishing, Inc.; 2000.
Miller A. Clinical Features. In: Cook SD, editor. Handbook of Multiple Sclerosis. Third New York, Marcel Dekker, Inc.; 2001.
Boneschi FM, Rovaris M, Johnson KP, Miller A, Wolinsky JS, Ladkani D, Shifroni G, Comi G, Filippi M. Effects of glatiramer acetate on relapse rate and accumulated disability in multiple sclerosis: meta-analysis of three double-blind, randomized, placebo-controlled clinical trials.  Mult. Scler. 2003; 9:349-355. 
Miller AE, Coyle PK. Clinical features of multiple sclerosis. Continuum 2004; 10:38-73.
Panitch H, Miller A, Paty D, Weinshenker B, North American Study Group on Interferon beta-1b in Secondary Progressive MS. Interferon beta-1b in secondary progressive MS: results from a 3-year controlled study. Neurology 2004; 63:1788-1795.
Miller AE. Glatiramer acetate in the treatment of multiple sclerosis. Neurol Clin 2005; 215–231. 
Miller A. Ethical issues in MS clinical trials. Mult Scler 2005;11:97-98. 
Wolinsky JS, Narayana PA, O’Connor  P, Coyle PK, Ford C, Johnson K, Miller A, Pardo L, Kadosh S, Ladkani D; PROMiSe Trial Study Group. Glatiramer acetate in primary progressive multiple sclerosis: results of a multinational, multicenter, double-blind, placebo-controlled trial. Ann Neurol 2007; 61:14-24.  
Miller A. Ethical consideration in multiple sclerosis clinical trials. In Cohen JA, Rudick RA. Multiple Sclerosis Therapeutics. Third Edition. Informa UK Ltd, 2007.
El-Moslimany H, Miller A. Escape therapies and management of multiple sclerosis. In Raine C, McFarland H, Hohlfeld R. Multiple Sclerosis: A Comprehensive Text. Elsevier Ltd. Edinburgh, 2008.

References

External links
PubMed search for Aaron E. Miller
National MS Society
Corinne Goldsmith Dickinson Center for Multiple Sclerosis*Mount Sinai Hospital
Mount Sinai School of Medicine

American medical academics
Brandeis University alumni
Living people
American neurologists
New York University Grossman School of Medicine alumni
Year of birth missing (living people)
Fellows of the American Academy of Neurology
American medical researchers
Icahn School of Medicine at Mount Sinai faculty